Maria Elizabeth (Marie) Levens (born 13 July 1950) is a politician who held the post of Foreign Minister of Suriname for five years (2000–2005). On 16 July 2020, Levens became the Minister of Education, Science & Culture.

Biography
Levens first studied at the Pedagogical Institute in Suriname, continued to study at the Vrije Universiteit Amsterdam and received her doctorate from the University of Amsterdam. In 1977, she returned to Suriname to teach at the Pedagogical Institute.

After having worked in education she joined the board of the Anton de Kom University of Suriname and contributed to the establishment of the school of Educational Sciences. The Institute of Quality Assurance at the University was her initiative; she became the first director of that institute and contributed to the national and regional Caribbean movement on the establishment of legislation and mechanisms on accreditation. She was the director of the Scholarship Program in Suriname negotiating with universities in Latin America, the Caribbean and Europe. She became Exec. Director of the Department of Human Development of the Organization of American States (OAS). She had worked at the OAS for 10 years, and started three educational programs. 

In 1993 she founded the Progressieve Vrouwen Unie (Progressive Women Union).

In 2000 she became the first woman to be the Minister of Foreign Affairs of Suriname. She served until 2005. Between 2005 and 2015, Levens was the programme manager for the Inter American Development Bank, and negotiator for the border issue with Guyana over the Tigri Area. In 2015, Levens became International Program Manager for the World and Regional Development Banks. In 2018, President Desi Bouterse nominated her for Minister of Education which she refused.

On 16 July 2020, Levens became the Minister of Education, Science & Culture in the cabinet of Santokhi.

Honours
Levens hold an honorary doctorate from the Vrije Universiteit Brussel.

References

1950 births
Living people
Foreign ministers of Suriname
Education ministers of Suriname
Culture ministers of Suriname
Science ministers of Suriname
Female foreign ministers
Women government ministers of Suriname
National Party of Suriname politicians
20th-century women politicians
21st-century women politicians
Surinamese educators
Women educators
Surinamese women diplomats
Vrije Universiteit Amsterdam alumni
University of Amsterdam alumni